Martin Damm and Cyril Suk were the defending champions but lost in the final 6–4, 6–4 against Paul Haarhuis and Sjeng Schalken.

Seeds
Champion seeds are indicated in bold text while text in italics indicates the round in which those seeds were eliminated.

 Tomáš Cibulec /  Leoš Friedl (first round)
 Chris Haggard /  Tom Vanhoudt (quarterfinals)
 Paul Haarhuis /  Sjeng Schalken (champions)
 David Macpherson /  Grant Stafford (first round)

Draw

External links
 2001 Heineken Trophy Men's Doubles Draw

Men's Doubles
Doubles